A cantharus, also known as a phiala, is a fountain used by Christians for ablution before entering a church. These ablutions involve the washing of the hands, face, and feet. The cantharus is traditionally located in the exonarthex of the church. The water emitted by a cantharus is to be running water. The practice of ablutions before prayer and worship in Christianity symbolizes "separation from sins of the spirit and surrender to the Lord." Eusebius recorded this practice of canthari located in the courtyards of churches, for the faithful to wash themselves before entering a Christian house of worship. The practice has its origins Jewish practice of performing ablutions before entering into the presence of God (cf. ). Though canthari are not as prevalent anymore in Western Christianity, they are found in Eastern Christian and Oriental Christian churches.

Gallery 
Famous canthari found throughout Christendom:

See also 

Seven fixed prayer times
 Holy water font
Home stoup, used by Christians for blessing oneself
Hygiene in Christianity
Lavabo, used by Christian priests in performing liturgical ablutions
Lavatorium, used by Christians monks for communal washing before meals
Maundy, the Christian rite of footwashing
 Sebil (fountain), an Islamic fountain for ritual ablutions
 Shadirvan, an Islamic fountain for ritual ablutions
Tradition of removing shoes in the home and houses of worship

References 

Ritual purity in Christianity
Hygiene
Church architecture
Fountains